Abdoul Salam Sow  (born 13 August 1970) is a Guinean former professional footballer who played as a midfielder for Ankaragücü, FC Martigues, Belenenses, Imortal, Qatar SC and Jeonnam Dragons. He represented the Guinea national team internationally.

Club career
Sow was born in Conakry, Guinea. He played one season with Martigues in the French Ligue 1. He also had a spell with Ankaragücü in the Turkish Süper Lig.

International career
Sow was part of the Guinea national team at the 2004 African Nations Cup, which finished second in their group in the first round of competition, before losing in the quarter-finals to Mali.

References

External links
 
 
 
 

1970 births
Living people
Association football midfielders
Guinean footballers
Guinean expatriate footballers
Guinea international footballers
1994 African Cup of Nations players
1998 African Cup of Nations players
2004 African Cup of Nations players
FC Martigues players
K.V. Kortrijk players
MKE Ankaragücü footballers
Jeonnam Dragons players
C.F. Os Belenenses players
Al-Gharafa SC players
Xanthi F.C. players
F.C. Marco players
Imortal D.C. players
Hafia FC players
Challenger Pro League players
Ligue 1 players
Süper Lig players
Primeira Liga players
K League 1 players
Super League Greece players
Expatriate footballers in Belgium
Expatriate footballers in France
Expatriate footballers in Turkey
Expatriate footballers in Portugal
Expatriate footballers in South Korea
Expatriate footballers in Qatar
Expatriate footballers in Greece
Guinean expatriate sportspeople in Belgium
Guinean expatriate sportspeople in France
Guinean expatriate sportspeople in Turkey
Guinean expatriate sportspeople in Portugal
Guinean expatriate sportspeople in South Korea
Guinean expatriate sportspeople in Qatar
Guinean expatriate sportspeople in Greece
Qatar Stars League players